Zheng Xiaoyu (December 10, 1944July 10, 2007) was the director of the State Food and Drug Administration of the People's Republic of China from 2003 to 2005.  He was sentenced to death for corruption and allowing possibly tainted products in Mainland China in the first instance trial at Beijing No.1 Intermediate Court on May 29, 2007. He was executed on July 10, 2007.

Biography
Born in Fuzhou, Fujian on December 10, 1944, Zheng Xiaoyu eventually studied to receive his bachelor's degree in biology from Fudan University in 1968. He joined the Chinese Communist Party in November 1979.

Zheng was the director of the State Pharmaceutical Administration from 1994 to 1998, the first head of the State Drug Administration, which he had successfully lobbied for its establishment, from 1998 to 2003, and director of the State Food and Drug Administration from 2003 to 2005.

In May 2007, Zheng was convicted of taking bribes and dereliction of duty and sentenced to death by a trial court in Beijing. He had taken bribes in exchange for personally approving unproven and unsafe medicines after taking bribes from eight pharmaceutical companies while working as the head of China's ministry of food and drug safety, bribes totaling more than 6.49 million RMB (or a rough  equivalent of 850,000 USD). These approvals caused the deaths of over 800 people in Panama from cough syrup that contained diethylene glycol in place of glycerin. It was also discovered that during the eight-year period of drug oversight, Zheng personally ordered approvals of more than 150,000 new medicines, a number 134-times that of the U.S. FDA (which approves, on average, ca. 140 new medicines annually). Most of those 150,000 medicines were the products of the eight pharmaceutical companies that bribed Zheng. A single unsafe medication of Anhui Huayuan Worldbest Biology Pharmacy, since closed, resulted in 14 patient deaths, hundreds being permanently disabled, and several thousand more falling seriously ill; Anhui Huayuan's CEO committed suicide before his arrest. Zheng's trial resulted in a death sentence. He was also ordered to forfeit all of his property.

Cao Wenzhuang, a former director of the same agency's department dealing with drug registrations was also sentenced to death in the first week of July, 2007, for dereliction of duty and accepting bribes. Cao had accepted more than two million RMB (or a rough equivalent of 250,000 USD). Cao received a two-year "reprieve" for his death sentence, "a ruling that usually [results in the death sentence being] commuted to life in prison if the convict is deemed to have reformed."

Zheng entered an appeal for leniency on June 12, saying that the sentence was "too severe" citing the fact that he had confessed his crimes and cooperated with investigators. However, the court ruled that while these were indeed mitigating factors, his crimes were far too serious to warrant leniency, and he was a "great danger" to the country and its reputation. The appeal was rejected on June 22 and he was executed on July 10, 2007. Lethal injection was used for the execution. In a note written before his execution, Zheng said he was sorry for what he had done.

See also

 2007 Chinese export recalls
 2007 pet food recalls
 Timeline of the 2007 pet food recalls 
 Gu (poison)
 Gu Kailai
 Protein adulteration in China
 2008 Chinese milk scandal
 Official test failures of the 2008 Chinese milk scandal
 Timeline of the 2008 Chinese milk scandal
Cheng Kejie

Notes

External links
  Zheng Xiaoyu's official profile on Xinhuanet

1944 births
2007 deaths
People's Republic of China politicians from Fujian
Politicians from Fuzhou
Chinese politicians executed for corruption
Expelled members of the Chinese Communist Party
21st-century executions by China
People executed by China by lethal injection
Executed people from Fujian
Fudan University alumni
Chinese Communist Party politicians from Fujian